Umberto Modiano Airport  is the airport serving Armação dos Búzios, Brazil. It is named after Umberto Modiano, a businessman who owned Marina Porto Búzios, Nas Rocas Hotel, and financially supported the emancipation movement of Armação dos Búzios, which was completed in 1995.

History
The airport was inaugurated in 2003 and it is dedicated to general aviation. On July 11, 2012 the facility was temporarily closed to conduct renovation works demanded by the National Civil Aviation Agency of Brazil. However, on May 28, 2016, after completing the renovations and legal procedures, the airport was again opened for general aviation.

Airlines and destinations

No scheduled flights operate at this airport.

Access

See also

List of airports in Brazil

References

External links

Airports in Rio de Janeiro (state)
Airports established in 2003